The Calling is an outdoor sculpture by Paddy McCann located in Belfast, Northern Ireland. Located at the junction of Gordon Street and Dunbar Junction, it consists of a bright red stylised male human figure calling into the distance while standing on an ordinary chair atop an extended (and angled) piston-like arm. A similarly mounted blue female figure, opposite the first, calls back across the square. It was installed in 2003.

References

Outdoor sculptures in Northern Ireland
2003 sculptures
Fiberglass sculptures in the United Kingdom